Robert T'Sas (11 March 1903 – 29 June 1981) was a Belgian fencer. He competed in the team épée event at the 1936 Summer Olympics.

References

External links
 

1903 births
1981 deaths
Belgian male épée fencers
Olympic fencers of Belgium
Fencers at the 1936 Summer Olympics